Melka is a surname. Notable people with the surname include:

Antonín Melka (born 1990), Czech ice hockey player
Elias Melka (1977–2019), Ethiopian record producer and songwriter
James Melka (born 1962), American football player
Michael Melka (born 1978), German footballer
Philippe Melka, French-American winemaker